Morad Zemouri (born March 3, 1993) is a Qatari judoka. He competed at the 2016 Summer Olympics in the men's 73 kg event, in which he was eliminated in the second round by Dirk Van Tichelt.

References

External links 
 

1993 births
Living people
Qatari male judoka
Olympic judoka of Qatar
Judoka at the 2016 Summer Olympics